Accent on Africa is an album by jazz saxophonist Cannonball Adderley recorded in 1968 for the Capitol label featuring performances by Adderley with Nat Adderley and unidentified percussion section, vocalists, and big band.

Reception
The Allmusic review by Richard S. Ginell awarded the album 3½ stars and states "this is one of the best and most overlooked of the Cannonball Adderley Capitols, a rumbling session that bursts with the joy of working in an unfamiliar yet vital rhythmic context".

Track listing 
All compositions by Julian "Cannonball" Adderley except as indicated
 "Ndolima" (Joe Zawinul) – 3:48
 "Hamba Nami" – 3:32
 "Khutsana"  – 3:58
 "Up and At It" (Wes Montgomery) – 3:36
 "Gumba" – 5:25
 "Marabi" – 2:50
 "Gun-Jah" – 4:16
 "Lemadima" – 3:38
 Recorded in San Francisco, CA on September 23 (tracks 2-4) & October 7 (tracks 1 & 5-8), 1968

Personnel 
 Cannonball Adderley – alto saxophone (3, 4, 6), soprano saxophone (1, 3, 7, 8), varitone (2, 5)
 Nat Adderley – cornet
 H.B. Barnum – arranger, conductor
 Unidentified brass, reeds and vocals
 Unknown – piano, harpsichord
 Carol Kaye – guitar
 Ray Brown  – bass
 Earl Palmer - drums
 Unknown – percussion

References 

1968 albums
Capitol Records albums
Cannonball Adderley albums
Albums produced by David Axelrod (musician)
Albums arranged by H. B. Barnum
Albums conducted by H. B. Barnum